EBSCO Information Services, headquartered in Ipswich, Massachusetts, is a division of EBSCO Industries Inc., a private company headquartered in Birmingham, Alabama. EBSCO provides products and services to libraries of many types around the world. Its products include EBSCONET, a complete e-resource management system, and EBSCOhost, which supplies a fee-based online research service with 375 full-text databases, a collection of 600,000-plus ebooks, subject indexes, point-of-care medical references, and an array of historical digital archives. In 2010, EBSCO introduced its EBSCO Discovery Service (EDS) to institutions, which allows searches of a portfolio of journals and magazines.

History
EBSCO Information Services is a division of EBSCO Industries Inc., a company founded in 1944 by Elton Bryson Stephens Sr. and headquartered in Birmingham, Alabama. "EBSCO" is an acronym for Elton B. Stephens Company. EBSCO Industries has annual sales of about $3 billion. It is one of the largest privately held companies in Alabama and one of the top 200 in the United States, based on revenues and employee numbers.

EBSCO Information Services originated in 1984 as a print publication called Popular Magazine Review, featuring article abstracts from more than 300 magazines. In 1987 the company was purchased by EBSCO Industries and its name was changed to EBSCO Publishing. It employed around 750 people by 2007. In 2003 it acquired Whitston Publishing, another database provider. In 2010 EBSCO purchased NetLibrary and in 2011 it took over H. W. Wilson Company. EBSCO Publishing merged with EBSCO Information Services on July 1, 2013, with the merged business operating as EBSCO Information Services. In 2015 EBSCO acquired YBP (Yankee Book Peddler) Library Services from Baker & Taylor, and later renamed it GOBI Library Solutions. , the President is Tim Collins.

Metapress was founded in 1998 as an online publication platform for content creators to produce and host their printed journal editions online. A division of EBSCO, the platform became one of the world's largest scholarly content hosts, with over 31,000 publications from over 180 publishers. Atypon acquired the Metapress business from EBSCO in 2014, with the Metapress platform to be discontinued and customers moved to Atypon's Literatum platform. Content was migrated to Literatum on May 21, 2015.

In February 2020, EBSCO Information Services announced their agreement to acquire Zepheira, a company founded in February 2007 and headquartered in Reston, Virginia with leaders in Semantic Web and who helped develop Dublin Core, BIBFRAME and the Library.Link Network. Following its merger, Zepheira continues to operates as an independent division.

Products
Databases: EBSCO provides a range of library database services. Many of the databases, such as MEDLINE and EconLit, are licensed from content vendors. Others, such as Academic Search, America: History and Life, Art Index, Art Abstracts, Art Full Text, Business Source, Clinical Reference Systems, Criminal Justice Abstracts, Education Abstracts, Environment Complete, Health Source, Historical Abstracts, History Reference Center, MasterFILE, NetLibrary, Primary Search, Professional Development Collection, and USP DI are compiled by EBSCO itself. EBSCO can be configured to route to open access publications through Unpaywall data.
Discovery: This product is used to create a unified, customized index of an institution's information resources, and a means of accessing all the content from a single search box. The system works by harvesting metadata from both internal and external sources, and then creating a preindexed service.
eBooks: EBSCO provides ebooks and audiobooks across a wide range of subject matter. EBSCO reports that their database includes over a million ebooks and 90,000 audiobooks from over 1500 publishers.
DynaMed Plus is a clinical reference tool for physicians and other health care professionals for use at the point-of-care. In 2012, it ranked highest among 10 online clinical resources in a study in the Journal of Clinical Epidemiology and also had the highest overall performance in the disease reference product category in two successive reports on clinical decision support resources by KLAS, a research firm that specializes in monitoring and reporting the performance of healthcare vendors.
It provides DRM-protected audio and DRM-protected audiobooks through its subsidiary NetLibrary, which was purchased in 2010 from Online Computer Library Center. It competes in this market with OverDrive's Digital Library Reserve.

Green and philanthropic initiatives
EBSCO has two large solar electric arrays, is converting its corporate fleet of cars to hybrids, has established a "Green Team" at its headquarters, and has released GreenFILE, a free database designed to help people research the impact humans have on the environment. EBSCO was awarded a 2008 Environmental Merit Award Award from the United States Environmental Protection Agency's New England Office and was honored by the Special Library Association as "Green Champions" as part of the association's "Knowledge to Go Green" initiative on Earth Day 2009.

EBSCO philanthropic initiatives include efforts to bridge the digital divide (between the industrialized world and developing nations) and work with the Open Society Foundations to provide essential research databases for universities in 39 developing countries. In 2012, the Stephens were recognized for their philanthropic work.

Other 
In 2017, conservative religious organization National Center on Sexual Exploitation, formerly Morality in Media, criticized EBSCO because its databases "could be used to search for information about sexual terms." EBSCO responded by saying that it took the complaint seriously, but was unaware of any case "of students using its databases to access pornography or other explicit materials".

See also
List of academic databases and search engines

References

Further reading

External links 
 

Publishing companies of the United States
Companies based in Massachusetts
Commercial digital libraries
Publishing companies established in 1984
EBSCO Industries
Bibliographic database providers
Academic publishing companies
Corporate subsidiaries
American digital libraries
American companies established in 1984
1984 establishments in Massachusetts